Several manga series have been developed based on the Haruhi Suzumiya light novels written by Nagaru Tanigawa and illustrated by Noizi Ito.

The first one, by Makoto Mizuno, ran from May to December 2004 issues of Shōnen Ace and was partially compiled in one volume published in August 2004. It was considerably different from the light novels in its one published volume, having little input from the original author.

The second series, illustrated by Gaku Tsugano, ran from November 2005 to November 2013 issues, with a younger target audience than the original novels. On April 17, 2008, Yen Press announced that they had acquired the license for the North American release of the first four volumes of the second manga series, promising the manga would not be censored.

The third adaptation, was an official parody four-panel comic strip titled The Melancholy of Suzumiya Haruhi-chan by Puyo started serialization in Shōnen Ace on July 26, 2007, and in The Sneaker on August 30, 2007.
Yen Press licensed the Haruhi-chan manga series for an English release in North America and  released the first volume on October 26, 2010.

Another manga, also by Puyo, was serialized in Kadokawa Shoten's Young Ace between July 2009 and August 2016. It is set in the alternate timeline established in the fourth light novel, The Disappearance of Haruhi Suzumiya, where Yuki Nagato is a shy schoolgirl as opposed to an alien. The series has also been licensed in North America by Yen Press.

A dōjinshi of note is the four-panel parody manga Nyorōn Churuya-san by Eretto (Utsura Uraraka). Starring a super deformed, smoked cheese-loving version of Tsuruya this manga was published in three volumes (released in August 2006, February 2007, and October 2007) before beginning serialization in the magazine Comp Ace in November 2008.

Volume list

Makoto Mizuno series
A Haruhi Suzumiya manga series was illustrated by Makoto Mizuno.

Gaku Tsugano series
A Haruhi Suzumiya manga series was illustrated by Gaku Tsugano.

The Melancholy of Suzumiya Haruhi-chan
The Melancholy of Suzumiya Haruhi-chan is an official gag manga series written and illustrated by Puyo in which the cast are depicted in chibi forms.

The Disappearance of Nagato Yuki-chan
Another spinoff manga series was written and illustrated by Puyo. Set in the alternate universe established in The Disappearance of Haruhi Suzumiya, it follows Yuki Nagato as its main protagonist.

Haruhi's Comic Anthology

The Celebration of Haruhi Suzumiya
This is an omnibus of three anthologies containing short stories from several different manga artists. On March 4, 2014, Yen Press announced they had acquired the license for the North American release.

The cover art is by Noizi Ito and the colour illustrations inside are by Puyo, Gaku Tsugano, Hiroaki Samura, Naru Nanao, Yasu, Miki Miyashita, Kaishuku, Jinsei Kataoka, Sekihiko Inui, TO18, Hajime Katoki, Okama, TIV and Mine Yoshizaki. There is an afterword at the end of the book that includes comments from every credited author and illustrator.

The Misfortune of Kyon & Koizumi
This is a one off collection of nineteen short stories by fifteen different manga artists. On April 8, 2012, Yen Press announced they had acquired the license for the North American release.
The cover art is by Aya Shouoto and the colour illustrations inside are by Akiho Narimiya and Ren Hidoh. There is an afterword at the end of the book that includes comments from every credited author and illustrator.

References

Haruhi Suzumiya
Haruhi Suzumiya